The Port of Oltenița is one of the largest Romanian river ports, located in the city of Oltenița on the Danube River.

References

Ports and harbours of Romania